Hanns and Rudolf: The German Jew and the Hunt for the Kommandant of Auschwitz is a dual biography of Hanns Alexander and Rudolf Höss by the British-American journalist Thomas Harding.

Reception
Hanns and Rudolf was a The Sunday Times bestseller in hardback and paperback in the UK, and a bestseller in Israel and Italy.

Awards and honours
 2015 Jewish Quarterly-Wingate Prize joint winner
 2013 Costa Book Awards, shortlisted (Biography)
 2014 Waterstones Non Fiction Book of the Month
 2013 Book of the Year in The Sunday Times, Times, Telegraph, New Statesman, Observer and Guardian newspapers
 2013, August Times Book of the Week

Editions
First UK edition: Hanns and Rudolf: The German Jew and the Hunt for the Kommandant of Auschwitz, Random House, Great Britain, 2013, 
First US edition: Hanns and Rudolf: The True Story of the German Jew who tracked and Caught the Kommandant of Auschwitz, Simon & Schuster, New York, 2013. 
German translation by Michael Schwelien : Hanns und Rudolf: Der deutsche Jude und die Jagd nach dem Kommandanten von Auschwitz, DTV, 2014,

Adaptations

In May 2014 it was announced that Hanns and Rudolf had been optioned by The Ink Factory Films and that the company was in talks with Sir Ronald Harwood to adapt the book. It was subsequently announced in May 2019 that the book had since been optioned by Altitude Film Entertainment.

References

External links
Thomas Harding, author website.
Book website

2013 non-fiction books
Random House books
Nazi hunters
British Army personnel of World War II
Jewish emigrants from Nazi Germany to the United Kingdom
German biographies